Bastardisation or bastardization may refer to:

 Corruption (linguistics), the idea that language change constitutes a degradation in the quality
 Hazing, activities involving harassment, abuse or humiliation used as a way of initiating a person into a group
 Hybridisation (biology), mixing two animals or plants of different breeds, varieties, species or genera
 Lacing (drugs)
 Cultural appropriation, adoption of elements of a culture by members of another culture

See also
 Bastard (disambiguation)